Richard Emery "Rich" Lingenfelter (April 5, 1934 – March 20, 2021) was an American astrophysicist and historian. He is known for his work on the origin of cosmic rays and gamma rays. As a historian, he is recognized for his efforts at chronicling the history of Death Valley.

Biography
Lingenfelter was born on April 5, 1934, in Farmington, New Mexico. He received his bachelor's degree from the University of California, Los Angeles (UCLA) in 1956. He then worked at Lawrence Livermore National Laboratory from 1957 to 1962, after which he worked at UCLA's Institute of Geophysics from 1962 to 1968. From 1969 to 1979, he was a professor in residence at UCLA's Institute of Geophysics and Planetary Physics, and in their Department of History. He was concurrently a faculty member in UCLA's Department of Astronomy from 1974 to 1979. In 1979, he joined the faculty of the University of California, San Diego (UCSD) as a research physicist, theoretician and senior lecturer. After his retirement he remained at UCSD as a research physicist emeritus at UCSD's Center for Astrophysics and Space Sciences.

Honors and awards
Lingenfelter received a Fulbright Scholarship to serve as a visiting fellow at the Tata Institute of Fundamental Research from 1968 to 1969. He was a fellow of the American Physical Society and the former Chair of its Division of Astrophysics. His other professional memberships included the American Geophysical Union, the American Astronomical Society, the International Astronomical Union, and the Western History Association.

References

1934 births
2021 deaths
American astrophysicists
20th-century American historians
American male non-fiction writers
People from Farmington, New Mexico
University of California, Los Angeles alumni
University of California, San Diego faculty
University of California, Los Angeles faculty
Fellows of the American Physical Society
Fellows of the American Geophysical Union
Historians from California
20th-century American male writers